Júlio César Valduga Camargo (born 12 January 1971 in Porto Alegre), known as Julinho Camargo, is a Brazilian professional football manager. He is the current youth football coordinator of Internacional.

Career
Julinho trained the youth teams of Grêmio (1989-1991) and Internacional (1994-2000).. He would later return to Grêmio for a four-year period from 2005 until 2009.

His first experience managing a professional team was in RS Futebol. He went on to coach Brasil de Farroupilha and Veranópolis, and worked as an assistant manager in Vitória. He coached for Caxias in Novo Hamburgo and then worked as an assistant to Falcão, in Internacional.

He returned to Grêmio  to train the main team for about a month before being let go. In 2013/14 he coached for Veranópolis, Ferroviário. and back again to Veranópolis. 
In July 2015 he assumed command of Goiás.

References

1958 births
Living people
Sportspeople from Porto Alegre
Brazilian football managers
Campeonato Brasileiro Série A managers
Campeonato Brasileiro Série B managers
Campeonato Brasileiro Série C managers
Grêmio Foot-Ball Porto Alegrense managers
Sport Club Internacional managers
Sociedade Esportiva Recreativa e Cultural Brasil managers
Sociedade Esportiva e Recreativa Caxias do Sul managers
Esporte Clube Novo Hamburgo managers
Goiás Esporte Clube managers
Brasília Futebol Clube managers
Boa Esporte Clube managers
Veranópolis Esporte Clube Recreativo e Cultural managers
Ferroviário Atlético Clube (CE) managers
Esporte Clube Juventude managers
Sampaio Corrêa Futebol Clube managers
Tombense Futebol Clube managers